Madison Guadalupe Hammond (born November 15, 1997) is an American professional soccer player who plays as a defender for Angel City FC of the National Women's Soccer League (NWSL).

Early life
Madison Hammond was born in November 1997. Her mother was in the military, so although she grew up in Albuquerque, NM, she moved to Virginia when she was 9 years old. She joined a girls' soccer club near her mother's base when they moved to Virginia.

Hammond's uncle was a big inspiration to her in athletics. He was a golf PGA Champion and played with Tiger Woods. 

Hammond was a four-year starter at Wake Forest University. During her senior year, she was second team All-ACC and was All-ACC academic all four years. She was also a member of the National Honor Society, as well as honor societies in Spanish, science and history. Hammond plays the violin and was a member of the Wake Forest orchestra while in college.

Hammond is the first Native American player in the NWSL, being Navajo and San Felipe Pueblo. Being both Native American and African American she has been very active in social justice for both communities while at Wake Forest and as a professional.

Club career

OL Reign
Hammond joined the Reign as a non-roster invitee ahead of the 2020 NWSL Challenge Cup. She signed as a pro ahead of the Fall Series, making her NWSL debut on September 26, 2020.

Angel City FC
Hammond was traded to Angel City FC in March, 2022. She played 319 minutes across nine games, earning three starts.

References

External links
 
 Wake Forest profile

Living people
American women's soccer players
Women's association football defenders
OL Reign players
National Women's Soccer League players
1997 births
Wake Forest Demon Deacons women's soccer players
African-American women's soccer players
Navajo sportspeople
Pueblo people
21st-century African-American sportspeople
21st-century African-American women
21st-century Native American women
21st-century Native Americans
Angel City FC players